Orlando Bates (born 11 January 1950) is a Barbadian former cyclist. He competed in the individual road race and individual pursuit events at the 1972 Summer Olympics.

References

External links
 

1950 births
Living people
Barbadian male cyclists
Commonwealth Games competitors for Barbados
Cyclists at the 1970 British Commonwealth Games
Olympic cyclists of Barbados
Cyclists at the 1972 Summer Olympics
Place of birth missing (living people)